The  was a fleet of the Imperial Japanese Navy (IJN), which was created, and subsequently disbanded on six separate occasions and revived on five separate occasions.

History

Russo-Japanese War
First established on 28 December 1903, the 3rd Fleet was created by the Imperial General Headquarters as an administrative unit to manage vessels considered obsolete for front-line combat service. These vessels were used primarily for training and for coastal patrol duties. The 3rd Fleet came under the aegis of the Combined Fleet for the duration of the Russo-Japanese War from March 1904. Although initially derided as a "dinosaur fleet", the 3rd fleet proved invaluable at the Battle of Tsushima and the Invasion of Sakhalin. It was disbanded on 20 December 1905.

South China Fleet
The 3rd Fleet was revived on 24 December 1908 as an expeditionary force during the Chinese Republican Revolution, to safeguard Japanese interests (civilians and property) on the Chinese mainland and (if necessary) to conduct emergency evacuation. It was nicknamed the "South China Fleet" after its chief area of envisioned activity was the South China Sea. Its cruisers patrolled the Yangtze River and other large rivers in China, and its headquarters was in the Japanese concession in Shanghai. It was disbanded on 25 December 1915.

World War I
The 3rd Fleet was reconstituted on the same day as the dissolution of the "South China Fleet", initially to act as a training force to supplement Japan's contribution to the World War I under the terms of the Anglo-Japanese Alliance. When the Russian Revolution was proclaimed by the communist forces in Russia, the mission of the 3rd Fleet was changed to that of patrols of the Russian sea coast for the Siberian Intervention by Japanese ground forces in support of anti-Bolshevik forces. The 3rd Fleet was disbanded on 1 December 1922, and many of its vessels were scrapped almost immediately under the terms of the Washington Naval Treaty.

First China Expeditionary Fleet
The 3rd Fleet was again raised on 2 February 1938 as part of Japan's emergency buildup of forces after the Shanghai Incident. The buildup took the form of three separate expeditionary fleets, consisting primarily of cruisers and gunboats to patrol the Chinese coast and major riverways and to support the landings of Japanese ground forces. With the outbreak of the Second Sino-Japanese War in 1937, the 3rd Fleet came under the aegis of the China Area Fleet. It was disbanded on 15 November 1939; however, some of the organizational and command structures for ground forces under the First China Expeditionary Fleet remained in place until August 1943.

Southern Expeditionary Fleet
The 3rd Fleet was recreated once again on 10 April 1941 with the additional designation "Southern Expeditionary Fleet" for the specific task of invading the Philippine islands. At the time of the attack on Pearl Harbor, its headquarters was in Palau and its mission expanded to include the invasions of Java, Borneo and other islands of the Netherlands East Indies. It was superseded by the 2nd Southern Expeditionary Fleet under the aegis of the Southwest Area Fleet on 10 March 1942.

Order of Battle at time of Pearl Harbor

Based at Takao, Formosa
12th Carrier Division
AV Kamikawa Maru (flagship)
AV Sanuki Maru
AV Sanyo Maru
16th Division
CL Nagara (fleet flagship)
CL Kuma
CA Ashigara
17th Division
AN/CM Itsukushima (flagship)
AN/CM Yaeyama
CM Tatsumiya Maru
CM Tatsuharu Maru
Supply Group
AR Yamabiko Maru
AP Senko Maru
AW Koan Maru
AW Asayama Maru (aka Chozan Maru or Chosan Maru)
AW Goryu Maru
AO Hayatomo Maru
AO Genyo Maru
AP Kosei Maru
AGS Kyodo Maru
5th Destroyer Squadron
CL Natori (flagship)
5th Destroyer Division
DD Asakaze
DD Harukaze
DD Hatakaze
DD Matsukaze
22nd Destroyer Division
DD Fumizuki
DD Minazuki
DD Nagatsuki
DD Satsuki
6th Submarine Squadron
AS Chōgei (flagship)
9th Submarine Division
I-123
I-124
9th Submarine Division
I-121
I-122
1st Base Force
21 Minesweeper Division
AM W-7
AM W-8
AM W-9
AM W-10
AM W-11
AM W-12
1st Gunboat Division
PG Busho Maru
PG Keiko Maru
PG Kanko Maru
PG Myoken Maru
1st Subchaser Division
PC Ch-1
PC Ch-2
PC Ch-3
2nd Subchaser Division
PC Ch-13
PC Ch-14
PC Ch-15
51st Subchaser Division
PC Kyo Maru No. 12
PC Kyo Maru No. 13
AN Tōkō Maru No. 1 Go
52nd Subchaser Division
PC Shonan Maru No. 17
PC Takunan Maru No. 5
AN Fukuei Maru No. 15
Other
AN/CM Shirataka
AN/CM Aotaka
AGM Ikushima Maru
AGM Kimishima Maru
AP Myoku Maru
AG Hakusan Maru
2nd Base Force
21st Torpedo Boat Division
PT Chidori
PT Hatsukari
PT Manazuru
PT Tomozuru
11th Minesweeper Division
AM W-13
AM W-14
AM W-15
AM W-16
30th Minesweeper Division
AM W-17
AM W-18
AM W-19
AM W-20
2nd Gunboat Division
PG Kamitsu Maru
PG Tokuyo Maru
PG Taiko Maru
PM Banyo Maru
3rd Gunboat Division
PG Aso Maru
PG Kiso Maru
PG Nampo Maru
53rd Subchaser Division
PC Kyo Maru No. 2
PC Kyo Maru No. 11
AN Korei Maru
54th Subchaser Division
PC Shonan Maru No. 1
PC Shonan Maru No. 2
AN Nagara Maru
21st Subchaser Division
PC Ch-4
PC Ch-5
PC Ch-6
PC Ch-16
PC Ch-17
PC Ch-18
31st Subchaser Division
PC Ch-10
PC Ch-11
PC Ch-12
Other 
CMN Wakataka
ACM Nichiyu Maru
PG/CM Imizu Maru
PG/CM Seian Maru
PG/CM Shinko Maru
AP Sumanoura Maru
AP Kumagawa Maru
AP Kenryu Maru
AG Hakozaki Maru
32nd Special Base Force
1st Patrol Boat Division
PB Patrol Boat No. 1
PB Patrol Boat No. 2
PB Patrol Boat No. 32
PB Patrol Boat No. 33
PB Patrol Boat No. 34
PB Patrol Boat No. 35
PB Patrol Boat No. 36
PB Patrol Boat No. 37
PB Patrol Boat No. 38
PB Patrol Boat No. 39
Other
CMc Kamome
CMc Tsubame
PG/CM Imizu Maru
AMc Nichiyu Maru

World War II (post-July 1942)
The sixth (and final) incarnation of the 3rd Fleet was formed on 14 July 1942 immediately after the disastrous Battle of Midway as an aircraft carrier task force modeled after similar units in the United States Navy. It played an important role during the Pyrrhic victory at the Battle of Santa Cruz, in which the American aircraft carrier  was sunk, but at the cost of many of the best air crews in the Japanese Navy.

After March 1944, the 3rd Fleet was basically merged with the 2nd Fleet, and suffered through the disastrous Battle of the Philippine Sea, losing 3 of its aircraft carriers, including the newly commissioned  and over 350 carrier planes.

In October 1944, the 3rd Fleet was designated the "Northern Force" in a three-force plan to defeat the Allied invasion of the Japanese-held Philippines. The 3rd Fleet carriers were divested of all but 108 aircraft and sent to lure the American-led fleet away from protecting the troop landing ships. On 25–26 October, facing a large force that included ten USN carriers, with 600–1,000 aircraft, 3rd Fleet lost 4 aircraft carriers, one light cruiser and one destroyer at the Battle off Cape Engaño. The 3rd Fleet effectively ceased to exist, and was officially disbanded on 15 December 1944.

Commanders of the 3rd Fleet

1st Creation (Russo-Japanese War)

2nd Creation (World War I)

3rd Creation (2nd Sino-Japanese War)

On 15 November 1939 the 3rd Fleet was reorganized into the 1st China Expeditionary Fleet.Admiral Oikawa retained command of the China Area Fleet but command of the former 3rd Fleet passed to Tanimoto Umatarō. Command History continues there.

4th Creation (Pacific War)

Chief of Staff

Notes

References

External links

3
Military units and formations established in 1903
Military units and formations disestablished in 1944